Pleasant Hill Methodist Church is a United Methodist church in Pleasant Hill, Saline County, Arkansas. The church was built by Walter Overhault in 1894 to replace the previous log structure used by the congregation. Locals of various religious denominations assisted in the church's construction, and the church has also served as a community center; it also hosts the yearly community reunion each July. The church was added to the National Register of Historic Places on June 5, 1991; it represents one of the best surviving examples of the simple Greek Revival style wood-frame churches of rural Arkansas.

See also
National Register of Historic Places listings in Saline County, Arkansas

References

United Methodist churches in Arkansas
Churches on the National Register of Historic Places in Arkansas
Greek Revival church buildings in Arkansas
Churches completed in 1894
Buildings and structures in Saline County, Arkansas
Wooden churches in Arkansas
National Register of Historic Places in Saline County, Arkansas